Kamaosi Village is a small village in the south eastern end of Santa Isabel Island, Isabel Province, Solomon Islands. It is close to Gululu. It contains one of the two high schools on the island, Sir Dudley Tuti College.

Sir Dudley Tuti College
The school composes a large part of the village. Prior to 1999, the school was the village and shared the same name. It was renamed after the late Sir Dudley Tuti, then chief of the island.  The school has an enrollment of 500.

References

Populated places in Isabel Province